The T. S. Eliot Prize for Poetry is awarded annually by Truman State University, which is a United States university located in Missouri. First awarded in 1997, the prize is given "for the best unpublished book-length collection of poetry in English, in honor of native Missourian T. S. Eliot’s considerable intellectual and artistic legacy". Eliot won the Nobel Prize in Literature in 1948. The prize includes publication of the collection as well as a purse of $2000. Poets submit their unpublished collections to Truman State University Press for each year's competition. A well-known poet is chosen each year to judge the collections, and to select the winner and several finalists.

List of winners
The winners, collection titles, and judges of the annual Prize are listed below. In addition to the winner, several finalists are announced for each year's competition. The complete list of winners and finalists is posted at the Truman State University Press website. As examples, Deborah Warren and A. M. Juster were finalists, and both Patty Seyburn and Daniel Bourne have been finalists twice.

References

American poetry awards
T. S. Eliot
Truman State University